Phausis is a genus of firefly beetles (family Lampyridae). These beetles are for the most part unimpressive in their appearance and behaviour, so have not drawn much study, and little is known about many of the species. Species in this genus are at least known from North America. Ten species are described in North America, ranging throughout much of the continent.

The genera Phausis and Lamprohiza are very similar and in need of revision; the delimitations between the two are not clear. Alternatively, Phausis may be paraphyletic and/or at least in part synonymous with Lamprohiza. The genus is traditionally placed in the tribe Photinini of the Lampyrinae, but at least the blue ghost firefly, Phausis reticulata does not seem to be particularly close to this group (or Lamprohiza for that matter) and might not even belong in the subfamily Lampyrinae.

Description
Most are brown to brown-black in colour and have transparent "window" spots in the front half of the pronotum. A key characteristic distinguishing adult male Phausis from most other firefly genera is the presence of a minute glassy bead at the tip of each antenna. Males have huge eyes.

Female Phausis specimens are assumed to be larviform; the females have not been discovered, possibly because they often live in burrows in the soil, so are not easily collected.

Most males are not luminescent, while females are likely to emit bioluminescence in the form of a continuous glow. Males of the species Phausis reticulata also emit a faint, constant glow.

Species
 Phausis californica Fender, 1966
 Phausis dorothae Fender, 1961
 Phausis inaccensa LeConte, 1878
 Phausis luminosa Fender, 1966
 Phausis marina Fender, 1966
 Phausis nigra Hopping, 1937
 Phausis reticulata – blue ghost firefly
 Phausis rhombica Fender, 1961
 Phausis riversi (LeConte, 1884 (1885))
 Phausis skelleyi Fender, 1961

References

Lampyridae
Lampyridae genera
Bioluminescent insects
Taxa named by John Lawrence LeConte